Medina, officially the Municipality of Medina, is a 4th class municipality in the province of Misamis Oriental, Philippines. According to the 2020 census, it has a population of 35,612 people.

The town got its name from Medina-Sidonia, Spain, after the Spaniards noticed the similarities of the features of the place with the ones in Medina-Sidonia.

Geography

Barangays
Medina is politically subdivided into 19 barangays.
 Bangbang
 Bulwa
 Cabug
 Dig-aguyan
 Duka
 Gasa
 Maanas
 Mananum Bag-o
 Mananum Daan
 North Poblacion
 Pahindong
 Portulin
 San Isidro
 San Jose
 San Roque
 San Vicente
 South Poblacion
 Tambagan
 Tup-on

Climate

Demographics

Economy

Tourism

 Portulin - from the phrase "Port of Orleans", where long ago big passenger ships came to pick up some passenger using small boats.
 Pelaez Ancestral House

References

External links
 [ Philippine Standard Geographic Code]
Philippine Census Information
Local Governance Performance Management System

Municipalities of Misamis Oriental